Laura Hoydick (born June 20, 1960) is an American politician who has served as the Mayor of Stratford since 2017. She previously served in the Connecticut House of Representatives from the 120th district from 2010 to 2018.

References

1960 births
Living people
Republican Party members of the Connecticut House of Representatives
People from Stratford, Connecticut